South Weald is a mainly farmland and park settlement in the Borough of Brentwood in Essex, England. The civil parish of South Weald was absorbed by Brentwood Urban District in 1934. In 1931 the civil parish had a population of 6370.

South Weald contains Weald Country Park, among its former mansion's residents was Octavius Coope brewer founding Ind Coope and who was for three different seats a national-level politician (MP) for one year each seat.

Origin of South Weald 
Though only 18 miles from London, the large parish of South Weald even today retains a strongly rural character. The name ‘Weald’ means forest, and in early times the parish lay in one of the most wooded parts of Essex. Today, perhaps South Weald is most known to locals due to the Weald Country Parks.

With South Weald being such a large parish (over 5,000 acres) it was inevitable that small hamlets should grow up in addition to the village clustered south of the parish church. These included Coxtie Green, Pilgrims Hatch and Brook Street. Yet another hamlet, straddling the main road in the highest part of the parish, developed into the busy urban centre of Brentwood.

Early History of South Weald 
The South Weald Camp covering about seven acres, now home to both weald country park and South Weald Cricket Club (divided by Sandpit Lane), has been dated back as far as the Iron Age.

Looking beyond that, it's certain from Roman times the parish was connected with London, and the long stretch of road westward from the top of Brook Street Hill is a reminder of the Roman track from Londinium. There is some disagreement about the continuation of the Roman road eastward, where to Chelmsford or to Maldon. But in the period of recorded history the main road from London to Harwich was the basis of Brentwood Development and certainly brought the whole parish in the picture of national events.

This is evidenced when the Domesday book was compiled to give a survey of the lands in each parish. As held at the end of the Saxon period and as granted by William the Conqueror to the great churches’ and to his followers, the canon of Waltham Holy Cross still held the estate of South Weald. The account in Domesday book, written in 1086 or soon after, gives the first detail of the parish and is summarised here. 'There were ten villeins (men of the village), six bordars, who normally held less land than the villeins, and three serfs. The canons had two ploughs for their communal agriculture. The canons also had 25 swine, 65 sheep and other animals; the woodland was measured as capable of feeding 200 swine and there was 1 ½ acres of meadow. In all, the estate was valued at six pounds, a sum which is however impossible to relate to in present-day value.'

The village of South Weald itself can compare with the most famed of Essex parishes, for it has distinct houses and a natural beauty of curve and gradient. The Tower Arms, with the date 1704 and the initials A.L.L.A above the entrance, was called Jewells according to a map of 1788, when the Spread Eagle, an earlier name of the Tower Arms, was on the other side of the road, west of the church; in 1684 it was called the Eagle and Crown and said to adjoin the churchyard. On the curve opposite the church and down Vicarage Lane there is a variety of architecture from the sixteenth century Wealdcote to the graceful Regency buildings of the Post office and its neighbour. Further down the Lane the Old Vicarage, with the arms of the Bishop of London and the entrance, is the fourth vicarage of which there is record.

Further reading

 W. Wilford A walk-around guide to the Parish Church of St Peter, South Weald 1985, revised 1992 and 2002
 Douglas Scott Hewett The Church of St Peter, South Weald 1950
Gladys A. Ward A History of South Weald and Brentwood 1961

References

Villages in Essex
Former civil parishes in Essex
Borough of Brentwood